Musa sikkimensis, also called Darjeeling banana, is a species of the genus Musa. It is one of the highest altitude banana species and is found in Bhutan and India.

Description
The plant is robust and about 4 m tall with a yellowish-green foliage and reddish tinged pseudostem. The sheath is smudged with blackish-brown and is without wax when mature, unlike Musa nagensium which has thick wax deposits in the pseudostem sheaths. The bases of the lamina bear a red-purple colour when young, which gradually fades, latest on the midrib. The inflorescence far outshoots the pseudostem, producing an oblique fruit bunch. The fruits are described as lax, arising from large, brown callosities on axis, angled at maturity. The pulp is scanty, dirty white to pale brownish-pink. Flowering and fruiting takes place from October to April.

References

External links
Images of cultivated Musa sikkimensis

Flora of Bhutan
Flora of India (region)
Fruits originating in Asia
sikkimensis
Plants described in 1877